YF, Y.F., or Yf can refer to:

Fictional vehicles:
 YF-19 Alpha One Excalibur, a spacecraft in the anime series Macross
 YF-21 Omega One, a spacecraft in the anime series  Macross

Real vehicles:
 A series of American aircraft, including:
 Lockheed YF-12
 YF-16, also known as General Dynamics F-16 Fighting Falcon
 Northrop YF-17
 Lockheed YF-22
 Northrop YF-23
 North American YF-93
 A series of Chinese rocket engines, including:
 YF-50t
 YF-73
 YF-75
 YF-77
 YF-100
 Yamaha YF 60, an all-terrain vehicle
 USS YF-116, a later name for the freight lighter USS Fashion (ID-755)

Squadrons:
 YF, the MODEX code for Marine Heavy Helicopter Squadron-462 (The Heavy Haulers, or its nickname "The Screw Crew")